Woodville is a baseball club playing in the South Australian Baseball League. Known as the Senators, their home ground is Don Klaebe Reserve in Findon.

References

External links
Woodville District Baseball Club

Australian baseball clubs
Sporting clubs in Adelaide